Ashina Nishufu (r. 679–680) was a member of the Ashina family that revolted following the fall of the Eastern Turkic Khaganate. He revolted against Tang dynasty to restore the Turkic Khaganate.

Revolt
In 679, Ashide Wenfu and Ashide Fengzhi, who were Turkic leaders of the Chanyu Protectorate, declared Ashina Nishufu as qaghan and revolted against the Tang dynasty. In 680, Pei Xingjian defeated Ashina Nishufu. Ashina Nishufu was killed by his men. 54 Göktürks including Ashide Wenfu and Ashina Funian were publicly executed in the Eastern Market of Chang'an. According to Tonyukuk, the attempt of the Ashide Wenfu and Ashide Fengji to revolt against the Chinese and set to the throne a qaghan was legitimate action and it was the people's fault that they deposed and killed him subduing themselves again to the Chinese.

Etymology
His name combines two titles: the first 泥熟 (EMCh: *niei-źiuk) < nīžuk, possibly identifiable with nezak, a non-Turkic title of unknown etymology, formerly used by Hephthalites and later adopted and re-used by the Turks; the second 匐 (MC: *bək̚) transcribes Turkic bäg.

References

Göktürk khagans